Paraxenodermus borneensis (common names: Borneo red snake, Stolickza's stream snake) is a species of snake in the family Xenodermatidae. It is endemic to Borneo and known from Sabah, Sarawak (Malaysia), and West and Central Kalimantan (Indonesia). The holotype was collected from Mount Kinabalu by Richard Hanitsch.

References

Xenodermidae
Snakes of Southeast Asia
Endemic fauna of Borneo
Reptiles of Indonesia
Reptiles of Malaysia
Reptiles of Borneo